Dream is the twelfth studio album by Japanese-American singer-songwriter Ai, released on February 23, 2022, by EMI Records. Ai collaborated with various Japanese and American producers, including longtime collaborator Uta and Bernard "Harv" Harvey, the latter produced her 2021 extended play, It's All Me, Vol. 2.

Three singles have been released from the album. The first single, "The Moment" featured Japanese rapper Yellow Bucks and was released in June 2021. "In the Middle", a collaboration with Daichi Miura was released in August 2021. The third single was "Aldebaran", which served as the theme song for the Japanese television drama Come Come Everybody. "Aldebaran" was a modest hit in Japan, debuting and peaking at number 37 on the Billboard Japan Hot 100 and at number 6 on the Oricon Digital Singles Chart. In 2022, "Aldebaran" won the Best Drama Song award at the 111th Television Drama Academy Awards.

Background and promotion 

Following the release of the extended play It's All Me, Vol. 2, Ai hinted on social media she was working on new music. In June 2021, she released "The Moment" with Japanese rapper Yellow Bucks. In early August, Ai announced she was working on a new single. The single was revealed to be a song with Daichi Miura, titled "In the Middle". In September, Ai announced her next single, titled "Aldebaran". The song would serve as theme song for the NHK drama, Come Come Everbody. She revealed the song was written by Naotarō Moriyama and featured arrangements by Neko Saito. The song was sent to radio in October, with the radio edit being uploaded to Ai's official YouTube channel to promote the song. Following the release of the full song in November, "Aldebaran" has received critical acclaim. In December, Ai announced her twelfth studio album would be released in February 2022. She stated that "Aldebaran" and "In the Middle" would be included on the album. Ai also announced the Dream Tour, which took take place in Japan from May to December 2022. In February, a special site was launched for the album by Universal Japan, revealing the full track listing of the album.

Music and lyrics 
Musically, Dream is a pop and R&B album with gospel and hip hop influences. Three songs, "First Time", "Lessons" and "We Have a Dream" were recorded entirely in English while the rest of the songs feature bilingual lyrics. The lyrics for "First Time" are based on when Ai first started her career and how she was able to find success through many trials. "Welcome Rain" features a delicate melody about loved ones, similar to "Aldebaran".

Commercial performance 
Dream debuted at number 12 on the Oricon Daily Albums chart for February 22, 2022. It rose to number 7 on February 23. On the weekly Oricon charts, Dream debuted and peaked at number 12, charting for 18 consecutive weeks. The album sold more copies than her previous studio album, Wa to Yo, and her extended plays, It's All Me Vol, 1 and It's All Me, Vol. 2.

Track listing 

Notes

 Tracks 1–20 of the limited edition bonus DVD / Blu-ray are noted as "Ai 20th Anniversary Tour It's All Me -Ai Birthday Special- @ Tokyo International Forum 2021.11.1"

Personnel 
Credits adapted from album's liner notes and Tidal.

Musicians 

 Ai Carina Uemura – lead vocals, songwriting, production
 Uta – production, songwriting
 Julian Le – production, songwriting
 Naotarō Moriyama – songwriting
 Neko Saito – production, arranging
 Daichi Miura – featured artist, songwriting, production
 Yellow Bucks – featured artist, songwriting
 Nao'ymt – songwriting, production
 Felisha "Fury" King – songwriting
 Fallon King – songwriting
 Kes Kross – songwriting
 Derek Anderson – production
 Kim – songwriting
 Nelson Babin-Coy – songwriting
 Midorin – drums
 Tomohiko Ohkanda – bass
 Fumio Yanagisawa – guitar
 Satoshi Onoue – guitar
 Hideaki "Lanbsy" Sakai – latin percussion
 Tomoyuki Asakawa – harp
 Great Eida – concertmaster, strings
 Jo Kuwata – violin
 Nagisa Kiriyama – violin
 Haruko Yano – violin
 Yukinori Murata – violin
 Akane Irie – violin
 Ayumu Koshikawa – violin
 Akiko Maruyama – violin
 Yui Kaneko – violin
 Masahiro Miyake – violin
 Yuji Yamada – viola
 Mayu Takashima – viola
 Ayano Kasahara – cello
 Yoshihiko Maeda – cello
 Space Dust Club – production, songwriting
 DJ Ryow – production, songwriting
 C3prod – production, songwriting
 Bernard "Harv" Harvey – production

Technical 
 Mizuo Miura – vocal recording, vocal production
 Keisuke Narita – assistant vocal recording, assistant vocal production
 Taji Okuda – vocal recording, vocal production, mixing
 Keisuke Fujimaki – vocal recording, vocal production
 Shohei Ishikawa – vocal recording, vocal production
 Masahiro Abo – vocal recording, vocal production
 D.O.I – mixing
 Mark Parfitt – mixing
 Randy Merrill – mastering

Visuals and imagery 
 Tatsuki Ikezawa – art director
 Shoji Uchihada – photographer
 Kanako Sato – retouching
 Shinji Konishi – hair, makeup
 Kumiko Iijima – stylist
 Machi Kagawa – designing
 Hirotaka Maeda – shooting coordination
 Erika Hiyama – shooting coordination
 Akiko Kawabata – AW production coordination

Charts

Weekly charts

Monthly charts

Release history

References

External links 

 Dream Special Site
 
 

Album chart usages for Oricon
2022 albums
Ai (singer) albums
EMI Records albums
Universal Music Group albums
Universal Music Japan albums
Albums produced by Ai (singer)